The Alsenz  is a river in Rhineland-Palatinate, Germany, a right tributary to the Nahe. It rises in Enkenbach-Alsenborn, north-east of Kaiserslautern, flows generally north, and joins the Nahe in Bad Münster am Stein-Ebernburg. Towns along the Alsenz include Winnweiler, Rockenhausen and Alsenz.

Rivers and lakes of Western Palatinate
North Palatinate
Rivers of Germany